Roll 'Em: Shirley Scott Plays the Big Bands is an album by the American jazz organist Shirley Scott, recorded in 1966 for the Impulse! label.

Reception
The AllMusic review by Scott Yanow awarded the album 3 stars, writing that "although nothing all that unexpected occurs, it is fun."

NPR, as part of its Take Five series, singled out the title track, writing: "Scott was powerful, especially for her size, but her style also employed control and subtlety, even when working with a large ensemble."

Track listing
 "Roll 'Em" (Mary Lou Williams) - 4:08
 "For Dancers Only" (Don Raye, Sy Oliver, Vic Schoen) - 3:43
 "Sophisticated Swing" (William Hudson, Mitchell Parish) - 2:51
 "Sometimes I'm Happy" (Irving Caesar, Vincent Youmans) - 3:54
 "Little Brown Jug" (Joseph Winner) - 3:57
 "Stompin' at the Savoy" (Edgar Sampson) - 3:57
 "Ain't Misbehavin'" (Thomas "Fats" Waller, Harry Brooks, Andy Razaf) - 3:30
 "A-Tisket, A-Tasket" (Van Alexander, Ella Fitzgerald) - 3:55
 "Things Ain't What They Used to Be" (Mercer Ellington) - 5:19
 "Tippin' In" (Robert Smith, Marty Stymes) - 4:33
Recorded  on April 15 (tracks 7-10) and April 19, 1966, (tracks 1-6).

Personnel
Shirley Scott - organ
Oliver Nelson - arranger, conductor (tracks 1-4)
Thad Jones, Joe Newman, Jimmy Nottingham, Ernie Royal, Clark Terry - trumpet (tracks 1-4)
Quentin Jackson, Melba Liston, Tom McIntosh - trombone (tracks 1-4)
Paul Faulise - bass trombone (tracks 1-4)
Jerry Dodgion, Phil Woods - alto saxophone (tracks 1-4)
Bob Ashton, Jerome Richardson - tenor saxophone (tracks 1-4)
Danny Bank - baritone saxophone (tracks 1-4)
Attila Zoller - guitar (tracks 1-4)
Richard Davis (tracks 7-10), George Duvivier (tracks 1-6) - double bass
Ed Shaughnessy (tracks 7-10), Grady Tate (tracks 1-6) - drums

References

Impulse! Records albums
Albums arranged by Oliver Nelson
Albums produced by Bob Thiele
Shirley Scott albums
1966 albums
Albums recorded at Van Gelder Studio
Albums conducted by Oliver Nelson